Stephan Burger (born 29 April 1962 in Freiburg im Breisgau) is a German Roman Catholic clergyman. Since 2014 he has been Archbishop of Freiburg and Metropolitan Bishop of the Ecclesiastical Province of Freiburg, succeeding Robert Zollitsch. His younger brother Tutilo Burger has been archabbot of Beuron Archabbey since 2011.

Life and career
Stephan Burger grew up in Löffingen, Germany with two brothers and a sister. His brother Tutilo Burger has been archabbot of the benedictines of Beuron Archabbey since 2011.

After going to primary school and middle school (Realschule), he went to boarding school at Immenstaad am Bodensee. He then entered the Collegium Borromaeum at Freiburg, which was then a hall of residence for those students of theology who intended to become priests, and studied philosophy and theology at the University of Freiburg and the University of Munich. On 20 May 1990 he was ordained a priest at Freiburg Minster and celebrated his first mass at St Michael's church in Löffingen. Burger spent his first years as a priest at Tauberbischofsheim and Pforzheim. In 1995, he was first parish administrator and later parish priest of St Mauritius in Sankt Leon-Rot. Between 2004 and 2006, while continuing to work as a parish priest, he studied for a licentiate of Canon Law at the University of Münster.

Starting 2002, Burger worked as defender of the bond (defensor vinculi) at the officialate (diocesan tribunal) of the Archdiocese of Freiburg. In 2006, he became promotor iustitiae and in 2007, was appointed judicial vicar and leader of the diocesan court. In this function he supervised the process of beatification for Max Josef Metzger. He was a canon of the Archdiocese of Freiburg between 2013 and 2014.

Archbishop of Freiburg
On 30 May 2014, Pope Francis appointed Burger to succeed Robert Zollitsch as Archbishop of Freiburg. His episcopal consecration and solemn inauguration through his predecessor Robert Zollitsch took place in Freiburg Minster on 29 June 2014. Other consecrating bishops were Cardinal Karl Lehmann, Bishop of Mainz, and Gebhard Fürst, Bishop of Rottenburg-Stuttgart. Stephan Burger chose Christus in cordibus ("Christ in the hearts") from the Letter of St Paul to the Ephesians (Eph 3:17) as his episcopal motto.

His predecessor Robert Zollitsch called Burger "conservative in a good sense" during his introduction of the new Archbishop.

During the autumn assembly 2014 of the German Bishops' Conference, he was made a member of the committee Weltkirche (Universal Church), president of the sub-committee for questions of development and the German episcopal charity Misereor, and member of the episcopal working committee for employment law. Since 2016, Burger is also president of the committee for Caritas, the German Catholic Relief Services.

Views (in selection)
Burger said in an April 2019 interview that abolishing the mandatory celibacy requirement for Catholic priests is possible under church law. The pope, as the Roman Catholic Church's supreme legislator, could change that, he said. However, he himself supports the celibacy of priests.

In a discussion evening with young Catholics in July 2021, which was broadcast publicly as a video, Burger took a negative position against the ordination of women to the priesthood. He said, he personally has a hard time with that idea.

In 2018, Burger had rejected the ecclesiastical blessing of same-sex couples for the Archdiocese of Freiburg. In his view, refusing the sacrament of marriage or ecclesiastical blessings in such cases does not constitute discrimination against same-sex couples.

Honours
Stephan Burger is an honorary member of the Catholic student's association K.D.St.V. Wildenstein at Freiburg.

In 2016, he has been appointed Knight Commander with Star of the Order of the Holy Sepulchre by Cardinal Edwin Frederick O'Brien, Grand Master of the Order, and was invested in Münster Cathedral on 21 May 2016 by Cardinal Reinhard Marx, Grand Prior of the German Lieutenancy of the Order. Burger is member of the Delegation Albertus Magnus Freiburg.

On 18 June 2016, Burger was appointed Conventual Chaplain ad honorem of the Sovereign Military Order of Malta during the general assembly of the German national association.

References

External links
http://www.catholic-hierarchy.org/bishop/bburger.html

Archbishops of Freiburg
21st-century Roman Catholic archbishops in Germany
Living people
1962 births
People from Breisgau-Hochschwarzwald